Law and Order is the first solo album by Fleetwood Mac guitarist/vocalist/songwriter Lindsey Buckingham, released in 1981. "Trouble", featuring drumming by Fleetwood Mac bandmate Mick Fleetwood, reached  9 on the U.S. charts; the album itself reached No. 32 on the Billboard 200. Lindsey appeared on Saturday Night Live on February 6, 1982 and performed "Trouble" and "Bwana" with Mick Fleetwood's Zoo.

Following the relative commercial failure of Fleetwood Mac's Tusk album, where many of the tracks were recorded in Buckingham's home studio, Mick Fleetwood informed Buckingham that the band was not interested in recording subsequent releases in the same manner. This was the impetus for Buckingham to create Law and Order. "In that moment, I realized, 'If I wanna continue to take risks [and] try to define myself as an artist in the long term, I'm gonna have to start making solo albums.'"

Reception

Jon Pareles of Rolling Stone, in a 4/5 star review, wrote that "based on the evidence of Law and Order... Lindsey Buckingham's biggest contribution to Fleetwood Mac has been his unabashed fondness for pop music at its most hokey and hooky." On the other hand, Robin Smith of Record Mirror panned the "miserable" album in a 1/5 star review, saying that it "sounds like the out takes of Mac's worst studio sessions delivered around [Buckingham's] reedy little voice."

In a retrospective review, William Ruhlmann of AllMusic gave the album 3½/5 stars, saying that it "comes off as a high-quality demo of largely unfinished material".

Track listing

Personnel 
Main performer
 Lindsey Buckingham – vocals, guitars, bass, keyboards, drums, percussion

Additional personnel
 George Hawkins – bass on "Trouble"
 Mick Fleetwood – drums on "Trouble"
 Carol Ann Harris – harmony vocals on "It Was I"
 Christine McVie – harmony vocals on "Shadow of the West"

Production 
 Lindsey Buckingham – producer, recording, Polaroid art
 Richard Dashut – producer, recording 
 David Brown – recording 
 Sabrina Buchanek – recording assistant 
 Judy Clapp – recording assistant 
 Dennis Mays – recording assistant 
 Larry Emerine – mastering 
 Stephen Marcussen – mastering
 Precision Lacquer (Hollywood, California) – mastering location 
 Larry Vigon – art direction, design 
 George Hurrell – front cover photography 
 Sam Emerson – back cover photography

Singles

Music promo videos
Two promotional music videos were shot for Law and Order, "Trouble" and "It Was I", both directed by Jerry Watson and produced by Paul Flattery. "Trouble" featured friends of Buckingham playing either guitar or drums. They included Mick Fleetwood, Bob Welch, and Bob Weston from Fleetwood Mac and singer-songwriter Walter Egan.

References

Lindsey Buckingham albums
1981 debut albums
Albums produced by Richard Dashut
Albums produced by Lindsey Buckingham
Asylum Records albums
Mercury Records albums
Reprise Records albums
Warner Music Group albums
Albums recorded at Wally Heider Studios